Luciano Reinaldo Rezende (born 5 August 1978) is a Brazilian Paralympic archer and Parapan American Games gold medalist.

He has competed once at the Summer Paralympics, three times at the World Para Archery Championships and once at the Para Continental Championships. In the 2016 Summer Paralympics he finished fourth in the men's recurve, being beaten to a bronze medal by Ebrahim Ranjbarkivaj.

References

Paralympic archers of Brazil
Archers at the 2016 Summer Paralympics
Living people
Brazilian male archers
1978 births
Medalists at the 2015 Parapan American Games
Sportspeople from Brasília
21st-century Brazilian people